Azóia is a town in the municipality of Sesimbra, parish of Castelo, near Cabo Espichel.

Towns in Portugal
Populated places in Setúbal District